Alucita lalannei is a moth of the family Alucitidae. It was described by Bernard Landry and Jean-François Landry in 2004. It is found in the Canadian provinces of Ontario, Manitoba and Alberta.

References 

Moths described in 2004
Alucitidae
Moths of North America